Lanzenkirchen is a market town in the district of Wiener Neustadt-Land in the Austrian state of Lower Austria.

Geography
Lanzenkirchen is situated on the river Leitha, south of the city Wiener Neustadt, at the foot of the Rosaliengebirge mountain range. The municipality consists of five Katastralgemeinden: Lanzenkirchen, Frohsdorf, Haderswörth, Kleinwolkersdorf and Ofenbach.

History

Origin of the place names in Lanzenkirchen
Lanzenkirchen: The name comes from a German settler who built a church. His name was Anzo or Lanzo. The name Lanzenkirchen was first mentioned in 1130.

Frohsdorf: The original name was Krottendorf because many toads were found in the water-rich area. It became Froschdorf in the 17th century ( means "frog"). Its present name has been used since the beginning of the 19th century.

Haderswörth: This name means "river island of Hadurich".

Kleinwolkersdorf: Until around 1800 the village was known as Wolfkersdorf, meaning "village of Wolfkers".

Ofenbach: The place was originally known as Quenbach. The origin of the name Ofenbach is unknown.

Sites of interest
Schloss Frohsdorf, a baroque castle
the 13th century St. Nicholas church in Lanzenkirchen

References

Cities and towns in Wiener Neustadt-Land District